is a railway station in the city of Hachinohe, Aomori, Japan, operated by East Japan Railway Company (JR East).

Lines
Same Station is served by the Hachinohe Line, and is 11.8 rail kilometers from the starting point of the line at Hachinohe Station.

Station layout
The station has one side platform and one island platform serving three tracks, connected by a footbridge. The station building has a Midori no Madoguchi staffed ticket office in addition to automatic ticket machines.

Platforms

History
Same Station opened on November 10, 1924, as a station on the Japanese Government Railways (JGR).  With the privatization of the Japanese National Railways (the post-war successor to the JGR) on April 1, 1987, it came under the operational control of JR East.

Passenger statistics
In fiscal 2018, the station was used by an average of 288 passengers daily (boarding passengers only).

Surrounding area
Hachinohe-Same Post office

See also
 List of Railway Stations in Japan

References

External links

JR East station information page 

Railway stations in Aomori Prefecture
Railway stations in Japan opened in 1924
Hachinohe Line
Hachinohe
Stations of East Japan Railway Company